Nikolina Ristović ( Pišek;   ; born 8 April 1973) is a Croatian television presenter and actress.

Early life
Born in Zagreb to mother Nada, young Nikolina was raised with a younger brother Domagoj. Teenage Nikolina reportedly gave modeling in Milan a brief try before returning home and enrolling in design studies at the University of Zagreb's Faculty of Architecture.

Through her university studies, Pišek soon applied and got hired for a photographer position at Globus magazine. She eventually also began writing a fashion column at the magazine.

After graduating, she worked as set designer for a few theatre productions, including the staging of Madama Butterfly at the Croatian National Theatre in Osijek. Afterwards, she worked in music video production.

Television career
Pišek's on-camera television career began in her mid-twenties courtesy of television producer Siniša Svilan who hired her as a co-presenter for an entertainment, gossip, and lifestyle show he was in charge of developing on the country's public broadcaster HRT in 2003. The Svilan-created Glamour Cafe featured co-hosts Pišek and Nina Skorup doing bits and interviews with plenty of gossip, innuendo, and overt sexuality. Somewhat provocative nature of the show combined with the duo of physically attractive young female hosts turned a lot of heads. Young Pišek's sudden prominence in Croatia led to an offer of a pictorial for the Croatian edition of Playboy that she accepted, appearing in the magazine's July 2003 issue. 

When Glamour Cafe was taken off the air, Pišek landed on Shpitza, another HRT gossip entertainment programme, this time co-hosting alongside Danijel Despot. Shpitza'''s main competition was similarly conceptualized  programme on the rival Nova TV station.

By now a recognizable public personality in Croatia, Pišek hosted HRT Dora in March 2007, Croatian selection for the Eurovision Song Contest. She started getting bit acting offers as well, which led to an appearance on the Bitange i princeze TV series. Further cementing her local star status was her fall 2007 participation as contestant on the second season of Ples sa zvijezdama, Croatian version of Strictly Come Dancing, airing on HRT.Shpitza somewhat ran out of steam and frequent changes at the male co-host position ensued. Despot got replaced by Mario Petreković who, in turn, quickly gave way to Luka Bulić. Soon, the show started losing viewership rapidly to Red Carpet, quickly leading to it being taken off the air in late 2007.

In late summer 2008, she left HRT for Nova TV, Croatian private TV station, thus reuniting with Siniša Svilan who had in the meantime become the head of programming at Nova. Once there, she got added to the daily Red Carpet stable of hosts, eventually getting her own timeslot with a slightly-modified version of the show named Red Carpet Light.

Arguably her biggest break came in late September 2008, almost simultaneously to her network switch, when she was announced as one of the four hosts of Operacija Trijumf (local Star Academy version for the five Balkan countries that used to be a part of Yugoslavia) alongside , Ana Mihajlovski, and Maca Marinković. Weekly appearances on the hugely popular 3-month long reality singing contest that aired on 6 networks and was seen by a large audience throughout Balkans led to a surge of popularity for her as well as expanded career opportunities outside Croatia. Among those are co-hosting the 2009 Pjesma Mediterana festival in Budva with  during early June 2009 and being slated to appear in a recurring acting role in a Serbian sitcom.

Throughout 2009 and 2010, she continued appearing on Nova TV programmes. She worked as a studio co-host during seasons 2 and 3 of the Farma reality show alongside Mia Kovačić and Dražen "Kocka" Kocijan. Pišek also took over for Ana Stunić hosting . In fall 2010, she was cast in a recurring role on the Croatian daily soap opera Najbolje godine: from November 2010 until June 2011, Pišek ended up appearing in 89 episodes of the show.

In the aftermath of her appearances on the hugely-popular Operacija trijumf, simultaneous to working on Nova TV in Croatia, Pišek began devoting more attention to raising her profile in the Serbian media market with regular appearances in the country's tabloids and lifestyle magazines. Furthermore to the end, in 2011, her collaboration with the young Serbian folk-pop singer Saša Kovačević was arranged via a song called "Idemo do mene". Though announced and officially billed as a duet between Kovačević and Pišek, her heavily autotuned singing part is quite small and she mostly appears as eye candy in the video.

Throughout late summer and early fall 2011, the news of her transfer to RTV Pink and relocation to Serbia received a lot of play in different media outlets throughout the Balkans. The show she was eventually attached to on Pink was a newly-launched weekly late-night programme meant to compete with a more established Veče sa Ivanom Ivanovićem, which was going into its third season on the rival 1Prva network.

Since 2018, Nikolina started working for Happy TV, and first show that she is hosting on that network is Soba sreće.

In 2023, Nikolina returned to the Croatian television, succeeding Antonija Blaće as the host of the second season of the Croatian version of Masked Singer on RTL Televizija.

Personal life
In 1997, during a relationship with journalist Mark Cigoj who wrote for Globus magazine at the time, Pišek gave birth to their daughter Hana. The relationship with Cigoj subsequently ended.

Throughout 2006, Pišek dated the Croatian businessman Tomislav Totić. 

From 2007, she started a relationship with the Croatian professional scuba diver Kristijan Curavić. The couple got engaged in spring 2009. Throughout spring and early summer 2010, her fiance Curavić was a contestant on the Farma'' reality show while Pišek worked as the show's studio host. The couple split during summer 2010. 

In 2010, she began dating the Berlin-based Serbian businessman Matija Ćorković. The relationship ended in 2012.

Pišek married Vidoje Ristović in September 2013, and moved to Belgrade. She gave birth to a baby girl in 2014. Vidoje died in May 2022.

References

External links
IMDb

1976 births
Living people
Television people from Zagreb
Croatian television presenters
Croatian women television presenters
Croatian expatriates in Serbia